The 1998 United States House of Representatives elections in South Carolina were held on November 3, 1998, to select six Representatives for two-year terms from the state of South Carolina.  The primary elections for the Democrats and the Republicans were held on June 9 and the runoff elections were held two weeks later on June 23.  All five incumbents who ran were re-elected and the open seat in the 4th congressional district was retained by the Republicans.  The composition of the state delegation remained four Republicans and two Democrats.

1st congressional district
Incumbent Republican Congressman Mark Sanford of the 1st congressional district, in office since 1995, defeated Natural Law candidate Joseph F. Innella.

General election results

|-
| 
| colspan=5 |Republican hold
|-

2nd congressional district
Incumbent Republican Congressman Floyd Spence of the 2nd congressional district, in office since 1971, defeated Democratic challenger Jane Frederick.

General election results

|-
| 
| colspan=5 |Republican hold
|-

3rd congressional district
Incumbent Republican Congressman Lindsey Graham of the 3rd congressional district, in office since 1995, was unopposed in his bid for re-election.

General election results

|-
| 
| colspan=5 |Republican hold
|-

4th congressional district
Incumbent Republican Congressman Bob Inglis of the 4th congressional district, in office since 1993, chose to run for Senator instead of re-election.  Jim DeMint won the Republican primary and defeated Democrat Glenn Reese in the general election.

Democratic primary

Republican primary

General election results

|-
| 
| colspan=5 |Republican hold
|-
|colspan=6|*Ashy also ran under the Patriot Party; his totals are combined.
|-

5th congressional district
Incumbent Democratic Congressman John M. Spratt, Jr. of the 5th congressional district, in office since 1983, defeated Republican challenger Mike Burkhold.

General election results

|-
| 
| colspan=5 |Democratic hold
|-

6th congressional district
Incumbent Democratic Congressman Jim Clyburn of the 6th congressional district, in office since 1993, defeated Republican challenger Gary McLeod.

Democratic primary

Republican primary

General election results

|-
| 
| colspan=5 |Democratic hold
|-

See also
United States House elections, 1998
United States Senate election in South Carolina, 1998
South Carolina gubernatorial election, 1998
South Carolina's congressional districts

External links
South Carolina Election Returns

United States House of Representatives
1998
South Carolina